Max Seefelder (1897–1970) was a German art director. He designed the sets for around 80 films during his career.

Selected filmography
 The Tunnel (1933)
 The Master Detective (1933)
 Inheritance in Pretoria (1934)
 The Fugitive from Chicago (1934)
 Between Heaven and Earth (1934)
 The White Horse Inn (1935)
 The King's Prisoner (1935)
 Thou Art My Joy (1936)
 The Unsuspecting Angel (1936)
 Street Music (1936)
 The Voice of the Heart (1937)
 Venus on Trial (1941)
 The Little Residence (1942)
 The False Bride (1945)
 Film Without a Title (1948)
 A Heart Beats for You (1949)
 The Blue Straw Hat (1949)
 Two in One Suit (1950)
 The Crucifix Carver of Ammergau (1952)
 The Mill in the Black Forest (1953)
 The Bachelor Trap (1953)
 Portrait of an Unknown Woman (1954)
 The Fisherman from Heiligensee (1955)
 The Forest House in Tyrol (1955)
 The Elephant in a China Shop (1958)
 People in the Net (1959)

References

Bibliography
 Bogusław Drewniak. Der Deutsche Film 1938-1945: ein Gesamtüberblick. Droste, 1987.

External links

1897 births
1970 deaths
German art directors
Film people from Munich